Fernando Bello (29 November 1910 – 30 November 1973) was an Argentine footballer. He played in nine matches for the Argentina national football team from 1935 to 1945. He was also part of Argentina's squad for the 1945 South American Championship.

References

External links
 

1910 births
1973 deaths
Argentine footballers
Argentina international footballers
Place of birth missing
Association football goalkeepers
Club Atlético Independiente footballers
Argentine football managers
Club Atlético Independiente managers